Crane is a masculine given name. Notable people with the name include:

 Crane Brinton (1898–1968), American historian
 Crane Kenney, American Major League Baseball executive
 Crane Wilbur (1886–1973), American writer, actor and director

English-language masculine given names